Glaucocharis hobbyi is a moth in the family Crambidae. It was described by David E. Gaskin in 1974. It is found on the island of Borneo.

References

Diptychophorini
Moths described in 1974